is a Japanese music producer and DJ. He is best known for his collaborations with composer Yuzo Koshiro on several video games, such as Streets of Rage 2 and Streets of Rage 3.

Biography
Kawashima was born in Nagoya City, Aichi Prefecture, Japan. He grew up listening to artists such as George Gershwin, Ryuichi Sakamoto, and Haruomi Hosono. He later moved to Tokyo and got interested in techno culture. During his time at Kunitachi College of Music he began producing techno music and was introduced to Yuzo Koshiro, who was looking for staff at his company, Ancient. He would go on to join his company in 1992, where he composed for Shinobi II: The Silent Fury and the Game Gear and Master System versions of Batman Returns, with Koshiro assisting him on both projects. The two would work together again for Streets of Rage 2 and Streets of Rage 3, with him composing approximately half of the latter's soundtrack. During this time they would also frequently go to nightclubs together for musical inspiration.

In 2010, he used the pen name Kylie & Kashii while working as a commissioned composer for the music label D-topia Entertainment. He would also compose for the Brandon Sheffield-designed game Oh, Deer!, which released in 2015. He also returned to compose for Streets of Rage 4 (2020) along with Koshiro and several others.

Works

Video games

Other

References

External links
 
Ancient.co.jp worklist 

Freelance musicians
Japanese composers
Japanese DJs
Japanese male composers
Japanese techno musicians
Living people
Video game composers
Electronic dance music DJs
Year of birth missing (living people)
Kunitachi College of Music alumni